The following is a partial list of sports writers.

Historical sportswriters

 Les Biederman
 Furman Bisher
 Jimmy Cannon
 Henry Chadwick
 George W. Daley
 Dan Daniel
 Pierce Egan
 Charley Feeney
 Larry Felser
 Mary Garber
 Halsey Hall
 Arnold Hano
 Sid Hartman
 W. C. Heinz
 Zander Hollander
 Jerome Holtzman
 James Jerpe
 Leonard Koppett
 Sam Lacy
 John Lardner
 Ring Lardner
 Fred Lieb
 Tim Murnane
 Jack Murphy
 Jim Murray
 Murray Olderman
 Edwin Pope
 Shirley Povich
 Rutherford "Rud" Rennie
 Grantland Rice
 Edwin Rumill
 Damon Runyon
 Red Smith
 Steve Wilstein
 Dick Young

 Bob Addie

North American publications

Atlanta Journal-Constitution
 Tony Barnhart
 Craig Custance
 Terence Moore
 Dave O'Brien
 Steve Wyche

Baltimore Sun
 Peter Schmuck

Boston Globe
 Amalie Benjamin
 Jackie MacMullan
 Bob Ryan
 Dan Shaughnessy

Boston Herald
 Steve Buckley
 Gerry Callahan
 Tony Massarotti

Chicago Sun-Times
 Rick Telander

Chicago Tribune
 David Haugh

The Plain Dealer (Cleveland, Ohio)
 Terry Pluto

The Dallas Morning News
 Tim Cowlishaw

The Dayton Daily News
 Hal McCoy

The Denver Post
 Jim Armstrong
 Woody Paige

Detroit Free Press
 Mitch Albom

Detroit News
 Terry Foster
 Jerry Green
 Bob Wojnowski

Fort Worth Star-Telegram
 Randy Galloway

The Fresno Bee
 John Canzano

Green Bay Press-Gazette
 Pete Dougherty

The Leesburg Commercial
 Lillian Vickers-Smith

Long Island Newsday
 Alan Hahn

Los Angeles Times
 Bill Christine
 Bill Dwyre
 Helene Elliott
 Bill Plaschke

Louisville Courier-Journal
 Tim Sullivan

Miami Herald
 Michelle Kaufman
 Dan Le Batard
 Edwin Pope

Milwaukee Journal Sentinel
 Drew Olson

Minneapolis Star Tribune
 Dick Gordon
 Sid Hartman
 Patrick Reusse
 Jim Souhan

Montreal Gazette
 Red Fisher

New York Daily News
 Mike Lupica
 Bill Madden
 Sherry Ross
 The Slammer

New York Post
 Mike Vaccaro
 Peter Vecsey

The New York Times
 Dave Anderson
 Bill Pennington
 William C. Rhoden
 Richard Sandomir

The Oakland Press
 Pat Caputo

Oakland Tribune
 Art Spander

The Oregonian
 John Canzano

Philadelphia Daily News
 Paul Hagen
 Phil Jasner

Pittsburgh Post-Gazette
 Al Abrams
 Mark Madden
 Stan Savran
 Bob Smizik

San Antonio Express-News
 Dan Cook

San Francisco Chronicle
 Ray Ratto
 Susan Slusser
 Tom Stienstra

St. Louis Post-Dispatch
 Rick Hummel
 Bernie Miklasz

USA Today
 Christine Brennan

The Washington Post
 Thomas Boswell
 Jennifer Frey
 Sally Jenkins
 Tony Kornheiser
 Michael Wilbon
 Mike Wise

British newspapers
 Simon Barnes - The Times
 Christopher Martin-Jenkins - The Times
 Neil Harman - The Times

Australian newspapers

Sydney Morning Herald
 Roy Masters
 Mike Cockerill
 Peter Roebuck

Herald Sun
 James Hird
 Mike Sheahan
 Bruce Wilson
 Mark Robinson

The Australian
 Mark Tronson (Field Hockey)

Sports authorship

Field hockey
 Mark Tronson

See also

Notes and references 

Lists of people by occupation
 
sportswriters